The Kirkland Formation is a geologic formation in New York. It preserves fossils dating back to the Silurian period.

See also

 List of fossiliferous stratigraphic units in New York

References
 

Silurian geology of New York (state)
Silurian southern paleotemperate deposits